Tasmatica, common name necklace shells,  is a genus of sea snails, marine gastropod molluscs in the family Naticidae, the moon snails or necklace shells.

Species
 Tasmatica modestina Ludbrook, 1958
 Tasmatica schoutanica (May, 1912) - synonym: Notocochlis schoutanica diatheca Iredale, 1936
 Tasmatica sticta (Verco, 1909)

References

 Iredale, T. & McMichael, D.F., 1962, A reference list of the marine Mollusca of New South Wales(p. 57), Mem. Aust. Mus., 11:0-0.

External links
 Sea shells of New South Wales: Tasmatica schoutanica

Naticidae
Taxa named by Harold John Finlay